Boat noodles is a Thai style noodle dish with a strong flavor. It contains both pork and beef, as well as dark soy sauce, pickled bean curd, and some other spices, and is normally served with meatballs and pig's liver. The soup is seasoned with pig or cow blood mixed with salt and spices ( or ). The colour of the soup is similar to beef noodle soup () but considerably thicker due to the blood added. It is commonly served in a small bowl.

The other ingredients of boat noodles are garlic, fried garlic, radish, cinnamon, bean sprouts, parsley, morning glory, and some Thai chilli flakes. Type of the noodles for boat noodle are several, thin rice noodles, egg noodles, sen yai (literally – 'big noodles'), and sen lek (literally – 'small noodles').

Boat noodles are commonly served with pork crackling and basil or sweet basil.

History
Boat noodles have been served since the period of Plaek Phibunsongkhram in 1942, and were originally served from boats that traversed Bangkok's canals.

In the past, a merchant who sold boat noodles would have been the only person working on a small boat, and would have had to do everything by himself from paddle a boat, scald the noodles, season the soup, serve the dish, handle money and wash the dishes. If the bowl was too big, it would be difficult to hand over to the customer on the land and might be easily spilled. This is the reason why the boat noodle's bowl is small, for the convenience and safety of the merchant.

Nowadays the dish is also served in restaurants, but the dish's historical identity is maintained by it still being served in a small bowl, and often with a boat moored in front of the place.

For notable boat noodles area in Thailand are Ayutthaya and Rangsit in central region, but presently the most notable is the Victory Monument neighborhood.

See also
Cuisine of Thailand
List of noodle dishes
List of Thai dishes

References

Thai noodle dishes
Noodle soups